Acrolepiopsis delta is a moth of the family Acrolepiidae. It was described by Sigeru Moriuti in 1972. It is found in Japan.

References

Moths described in 1961
Acrolepiidae
Moths of Japan